The men's triple jump event  at the 1978 European Athletics Indoor Championships was held on 12 March in Milan.

Results

References

Triple jump at the European Athletics Indoor Championships
Triple